Alfred Strasser (born 8 February 1954) is a retired Swiss football defender and later manager.

References

1954 births
Living people
Swiss men's footballers
FC Zürich players
FC Wettingen players
Association football defenders
Swiss football managers
FC Wettingen managers
FC Aarau managers